Beto Benites (born c. 1970) is a Peruvian actor, casting director, and producer.

In 2011, he played the part of Don Luis Sandoval, the drug lord in Olivier Megaton's film Colombiana, starring Zoe Saldana.

Filmography

Film

References

External links

Peruvian male film actors
Venezuelan film producers
Casting directors
Living people
21st-century Peruvian male actors
Place of birth missing (living people)
1970 births